Silver Legacy Resort & Casino is a hotel and casino located in Downtown Reno, Nevada. It anchors a network of connected hotel-casinos in the downtown Reno core that included Circus Circus Reno and Eldorado Reno and are owned and operated by Caesars Entertainment. It has over 1,700 hotel rooms and suites and is the tallest building in Reno.

Previous joint venture owners of Silver Legacy Resort & Casino (along with Eldorado Resorts) were Mandalay Resort Group, formerly known as Circus Circus Enterprises (1995–2005) and MGM Resorts International, formerly known as MGM Mirage (2005–2015).

History
In 1992, Don Carano, a long time Reno attorney and CEO/Chairman of the Eldorado Hotel Casino and Clyde Turner, CEO of Circus Circus Enterprises joined together to design the Silver Legacy. At the time, Las Vegas in Southern Nevada was growing fast and far overtaking Reno with larger and more lavish casino-hotels. Carano wanted to create a similar, competitive hotel casino-resort. The total cost was projected at $230 million. On July 22, 1993, the special use permit was approved to go ahead with the construction on land owned by Carano, two city blocks which would link the new resort with Eldorado and Circus Circus.

Carano and Turner announced the official name of the resort on December 15, 1994. Following a citywide competition to name Reno's newest resort in more than a decade, the winning name "Silver Legacy" was chosen. In June 1995, the Nevada Gaming Commission approved the gaming permit for the resort. It opened on July 28, 1995.

Carano's eldest son, Gary, served as CEO of the property and later on, his next eldest son, Glenn Carano, would join the executive team at the resort as Director of Marketing. In 2014, Glenn became the General Manager while Gary became CEO of Eldorado Resorts, Inc. 
The Silver Legacy also made the big screen, first in Kingpin in 1996 starring Woody Harrelson and Bill Murray, the movie showcasing the newest attractions of Reno-The Silver Legacy, and the nearby National Bowling Stadium, also completed in 1995. Glenn Carano made a short appearance in the film and many scenes were shot inside the resort. Later, in 2002, Waking Up in Reno starring Patrick Swayze, Billy Bob Thornton, Charlize Theron and Natasha Richardson, was partially filmed inside Silver Legacy. 
In 2014, Glenn Carano was promoted to General Manager of Silver Legacy Reno.

At 42 stories tall, the Resort Casino is the largest building in Downtown Reno. It also spent two years as the tallest building in Nevada, and is still the tallest building in Nevada outside of the Las Vegas Valley. The Legacy is typically lit green at night and is referred to by many as the "Emerald City" of Reno. Visitors occasionally compare the green lighting to the appearance of Minas Morgul, from Peter Jackson’s adaptation of the Lord of the Rings series. In support of the Nevada Wolf Pack, the Silver Legacy will sometimes turn blue. In 2013, a contest was held online to vote on if the building should turn blue permanently, but it was the color Emerald Green that won the decision.

In July 2013, Silver Legacy founded the Biggest Little City Wing Fest, a three-day chicken wing festival held on Virginia Street in front of the casino. The festival started with just a few local wing cookers but has since grown to feature 25 businesses from around the United States. In 2014, Wing King won an award for the Hottest Hot Wing and Paulie's Pizza won People's Choice Wing.

While the resort was established in 1995, an awning on the building's front entrance states that it was established a century earlier, in 1895. This date is a nod to the building's 19th century theme.

On July 7, 2015, MGM Resorts International agreed to sell its properties in Reno (Circus Circus Reno and a 50% stake in the Silver Legacy) to Eldorado Resorts for $72.5 million. The sale was approved and completed in November later that year.

In October 2018, Eldorado Resorts permanently shut down the Flavors! The Buffet (formerly The Victorian Buffet), leaving The Buffet at Eldorado Reno under their ownership.

Retail
There are six restaurants inside the Silver Legacy including Café Central (formerly Sweetwater Café and Café Sedona), Canter's Delicatessen (formerly Fresh Express Food Court and Triple Play Sports Grill), Ruth's Chris Steak House (formerly Sterling's Seafood Steakhouse), Sips Coffee and Tea, Starbucks and The Pearl Oyster Bar & Grill (formerly Fairchild's Oyster Bar). The Pearl Oyster Bar & Grill was opened in 2013 as an ode to Fairchild's, also an Oyster Bar that was open at Silver Legacy until 2013. There are eight retail stores located in the Resort Casino including The Boutique, Tradewinds Casualwear, Reflections, Carriage House, The Gift Shop, and Chester's Harley-Davidson. In 2015, Silver Legacy opened two new retail stores inside including a new children's store named Lil' Big Stuff Kid's Sweet Boutique which sells children's clothing, toys, accessories, and a large variety of retro candy. Libellule Florals is the other retail outlet that opened.

References

External links
 
 

1995 establishments in Nevada
Casino hotels
Casinos completed in 1995
Casinos in Reno, Nevada
Caesars Entertainment
Hotel buildings completed in 1995
Hotels established in 1995
Hotels in Reno, Nevada
Mandalay Resort Group
Resorts in Nevada
Skyscraper hotels in Nevada